Ilona Grīnberga (born 11 January 1966) is a Latvian windsurfer. She competed in the 1992 Summer Olympics and the 1996 Summer Olympics.

References

External links
 
 

1966 births
Living people
Latvian female sailors (sport)
Latvian windsurfers
Olympic sailors of Latvia
Sailors at the 1992 Summer Olympics – Lechner A-390
Sailors at the 1996 Summer Olympics – Mistral One Design
Female windsurfers